Alias Jimmy Valentine is an old-time radio crime drama in the United States. It was broadcast on NBC-Blue January 18, 1938 - February 27, 1939.

Format
The concept for Alias Jimmy Valentine came from writer O. Henry in his short story "A Retrieved Reformation". That story was adapted into the 1910 play Alias Jimmy Valentine by Paul Armstrong. 

The program's stories focused on Lee Randall, described by Jim Cox in his book, Radio Crime Fighters: More Than 300 Programs from the Golden Age as "an ex-con and reformed safecracker [who] applied his talents and enormous underworld contacts to abet the forces of law and order". While doing so, he became an honest bank clerk and fell in love with the daughter of the banker.

Producers
The series was produced by Frank and Anne Hummert, who were described by Jim Cox in his book, Frank and Anne Hummert's Radio Factory: The Programs and Personalities of Broadcasting's Most Prolific Producers as "the most prolific creatives in eight decades of broadcast history". They originated more than 100 radio series, about half of which were soap operas.

Cox wrote that Alias Jimmy Valentine episodes raised "the never-to-be-resolved query: 'Can a protagonist go straight and overcome his impasse?'" That query, Cox wrote, "was true formulaic Hummert".

Personnel
Bert Lytell and James Meighan each played the lead at different times. William Bennett Kilpack and Earle Latimore also appeared on the program.

Dick Joy was the announcer. Doris Halman was the writer. Ford Bond narrated.

See also
 Alias Jimmy Valentine (1920 film) 
 Alias Jimmy Valentine (1928 film)

References 

1938 radio programme debuts
1939 radio programme endings
1938 radio dramas
1939 radio dramas
NBC Blue Network radio programs